The Alexandra Ballet is a pre-professional ballet company in St. Louis, Missouri, founded in 1949, that cultivates top dance talent.  The company regularly performs classical ballets including A Midsummer Night’s Dream, Pas de Quatre, Les Sylphides, and an annual performance of The Nutcracker. Many guest choreographers have worked with Alexandra Ballet including Marek Cholewa, Petrus Bosman, and Kennet Oberly.

History 
In 1949, Alexandra Zaharias first opened the Alexandra School of Ballet at Olive and Boyle in the city of Saint Louis. Prior to 1949, there were few ballet schools or ballet teachers in St. Louis. Alexandra Zaharias decided to go to New York to study under George Balanchine after seeing legendary ballerina Alexandra Danilova dance Swan Lake at the Kiel Opera House.  When she returned to St. Louis, she opened the Alexandra School of Ballet.

Alexandra School of Ballet 
As a pre-professional ballet school, Alexandra Ballet focuses exclusively on classical ballet.  Established in 1949, Alexandra Ballet is the only St. Louis ballet school to continually provide pre-professional ballet training in Vaganova (Russian), Paris Opera (French), Enrico Cecchetti (Italian), Balanchine (American), Bournonville (Danish) ballet techniques.  Dance classes range from creative dance and pre-ballet for young dancers just starting out to technical training in academic ballet, pointe work, variations, pas de deux, character, modern, and men’s classes, all designed for the serious ballet dancer. All of the school's faculty has been selected with great care and is led by Alexandra Zaharias.

Today  
The company is an early member of Regional Dance America (RDA), achieving RDA's highest ranking of "Honor Company" status, and has been host to the Mid-States Regional Dance America Festival.  Currently, the company has over 30 dancers that regularly win scholarships and awards each year. The company performs at the Purser Center of Logan University in Chesterfield, Missouri, as well as at the Blanche M. Touhill Performing Arts Center of University of Missouri-St. Louis in Saint Louis, Missouri.  Its repertoire consists of both classical and contemporary pieces, as well as its annual December performance of The Nutcracker.

Professional alumni 

 Andrea Lucas
 Antonio Douthit
 Chavo Killingsworth
 Cheryl Balbes McIlhon
 Dillon Malinski
 Elizabeth Farrell
 Ellen d`Hemecourt
 Emily Stephenitch
 Eugenia Hoeflin
 Jaha Vanderford
 Jane McGary
 Jennifer Deckert
 Jennifer Reed
 Jessica Ruhlin
 Lisa Wolfsberger
 Louise Nadeau
 Makenzie Howe
 Mariko Kumanomido
 Mary-Jean Cowell
 Megan Buckley
 Philip Gardner
 Rachel Peppin
 Rodney Hamilton
 Sara Stockman
 Sarah Little
 Sarah Megel
 Sharon Lampros
 Susan Checkett Heidemann

Past performances 

 A Midsummer Night’s Dream 1993, 1999, 2006, 2013
 Alice in Wonderland 2003
 Ballare 1989
 Charminade 1986
 Cinderella 2009
 Concerto 1988
 Concerto Polonaise 1993, 1999
 Coppelia 2001, 2008, 2014
 de l'innocence 2007
 Don Quixote Suite 2010
 Elagiague 1997
 Esmeralda 2005
 Fete Polonaise 1987
 Horra Tango 2009
 The Firebird 2007
 Flute Fantasy 1999
 Frescoes 1997
 Giselle 1990, 1999, 2010
 Good Gracious, Gershwin! 1994
 Diana and Actheon Pas de Deux 1992
 Happy Ending 1991
 Harlequinade 1999, 2005
 Kermes in Bruges 2010
 Konservatoriet 2008
 L’ Audition Improptu 1994
 La Bayadere (Kingdom of the Shades) 1993, 2005
 La Fille Mal Gardee 2002
 Larks and Follies 1987
 Le Corsaire (Pas de Deux) 2005
 Le Jardin Animee 1996, 2013
 Leib der Tanz 1991
 Les Patineurs 2008
 Les Sylphides 1994, 1999, 2009
 Moldavian Suite 2007
 Nutcracker (annually)
 Napoli 2007
 Odyssey 1990
 Origami 1993, 2000
 Pagosiana 2005
 Paquita 1991, 2006
 Pas de Quatre 1985, 1988, 2000, 2007
 Peter and the Wolf 1990
 Pezzi per Ametisto 1993
 Pollaca Guerriera 2008
 Quartet 1989
 Reflections of Childhood 1992
 Rinforzando 1991
 Rodeo 1998
 Rumors 1995
 Sinfonetta 1990
 Swan Lake 1996, 2005 (Pas de Deux, Act II)
 Symphonic Danse 1991
 The Sleeping Beauty 1998, 2004, 2012
 Totenlieder 1987
 Triangulum 1992
 Trio For Four 1989
 Unplugged 2010
 Untitled for Unaccompanied Cello 1989
 La Vivandiere 1994

References

External links 

Ballet schools in the United States
Ballet companies in the United States
1949 establishments in Missouri
Performing groups established in 1949
Dance in Missouri